Elisha Margaret Thomas (born July 20, 1981) is a volleyball player from the United States, who played as a middle-blocker.

She represented United States women's national volleyball team at the 2003 FIVB World Grand Prix.

Clubs

References

External links 
 
 player bio, FIVB
 
 player bio legavolleyfemminile.it

American women's volleyball players
1981 births
Living people
Long Beach State Beach women's volleyball players
Middle blockers
American expatriate sportspeople in Japan
American expatriate sportspeople in Russia
American expatriate sportspeople in the Czech Republic
American expatriate sportspeople in Azerbaijan
Expatriate volleyball players in Japan
Expatriate volleyball players in Russia
Expatriate volleyball players in the Czech Republic
Expatriate volleyball players in Azerbaijan
Volleyball players from Long Beach, California